The 2020 season is Albirex Niigata Singapore FC's 17th consecutive season in the top flight of Singapore football and in the S.League, having joined the Sleague in 2004. Along with the 2019 Singapore Premier League, the club will also compete in the Singapore Cup and the Singapore League Cup.

Squad

SPL Squad

U17 Squad

Coaching staff

Transfer

Pre-season transfer

In 

Note 1: Shahrul Nizam left the club before the season start due to personal reason.

Out

Note 1: Yosuke Nakagawa returned to Mito HollyHock after the loan and subsequently released. He joined Hokkaido Tokachi Sky Earth for the season.

Note 2: Naruki Takahashi moved to  Box Hill United SC who is playing in the NPL (Victoria) 2 after his contract with Montedio Yamagata ended.

Retained / Extension

Mid-season transfer

In

Out 

Note 1: Zamani Zamri was enlisted to NS in April 2020. 

Note 2: Daniel Goh was enlisted to NS in June 2020.

Friendly

Pre-season friendlies

Team statistics

Appearances and goals

Competitions

Singapore Premier League

Singapore Cup

Notes

References

Albirex Niigata Singapore FC
Albirex Niigata Singapore FC seasons